Thomas Waldrop Moore (September 17, 1918 – 31 March 2007) was an American television executive who headed ABC in the 1960s.

Biography
Moore was born in Meridian, Mississippi. He attended Mississippi State University and graduated from University of Missouri, then served in the United States Navy as a pilot through World War II. After the war, he took a job as spokesman for Los Angeles-based Forest Lawn Memorial-Parks & Mortuaries. In 1947, he began selling airtime for CBS Radio before being hired by ABC as vice president of sales in 1956.

He was ABC's vice president of programming from 1956 to 1957, then network president from 1957 to 1969.

Among the shows aired during this time were The Real McCoys, 77 Sunset Strip, My Three Sons, The Flintstones, Ben Casey, and The Untouchables. While he was network president, the network added, among other shows, McHale's Navy, Peyton Place, The Addams Family and Batman.

Moore had a rising Howard Cosell removed from ABC television on-air work in 1959 because he didn't like him. Cosell's removal was rumored to be linked to anti-Semitism, but Cosell himself never directly ascribed to that explanation.

He left ABC to become chairman of computerized event ticketing company Ticketron and, in December 1970, resigned to become president of newly formed General Electric subsidiary and production company, Tomorrow Entertainment. The shows they produced were nominated for ten Emmy Awards, winning at least five.

References

External links

 North To Alaska: Moore's memoir of his time in the Navy.
 

1918 births
2007 deaths
American television executives
People from Meridian, Mississippi
University of Missouri alumni
American Broadcasting Company executives
Presidents of the American Broadcasting Company
American Broadcasting Company Vice Presidents of Programs
United States Navy personnel of World War II